Brooklyn Babylon is a 2001 film written and directed by Marc Levin, and a modern retelling of the Song of Solomon, set against the backdrop of the Crown Heights riot, starring Black Thought of The Roots.

Plot summary
In Brooklyn's Crown Heights, where West Indian Rastafarians and other Blacks live next door to the Jewish Chabad community, ethnic tensions are high. After a minor car crash, the headstrong Judah and other Jewish men who patrol the neighborhood as vigilantes confront Scratch, a mouthy hustler. Passengers in the cars make eye contact: Sol, a hip-hop musician, songwriter, and artist (Scratch's friend), and Sara, who is betrothed to Judah but wants to go to college and be on her own. Over the next few days, while Scratch and Judah's conflict escalates in violence, Sara and Sol connect in ways that echo Sheba and Solomon.

Production
Brooklyn Babylon was the second-made of Levin's late nineties hip-hop trilogy, which began with Slam, a searing prison drama starring Saul Williams, Sonja Sohn and Bonz Malone. The third installment was 2000's Whiteboyz, a black comedy about white farm kids in Iowa who want to be black rappers, and starred Danny Hoch, Dash Mihok, Mark Webber and Piper Perabo.

Cast
Tariq Trotter as Solomon, Member of The Lions
Karen Starc as Sara (as Karen Goberman)
Bonz Malone as Scratch 	
David Vadim as Judah
Carol Woods as Cislyn
Slick Rick as Buddah
Mad Cobra as Key Bouncer
Mina Bern as Nanna
Joanne Baron as Aunt Rose
Olek Krupa	as Uncle Vlad

Roots members Ahmir "Questlove" Thompson, James "Kamal" Gray, Leonard "Hub" Hubbard and Kyle "Scratch" Jones played other members of The Lions, and Roots beatbox artist Rahzel served as the film's narrator.

Festivals
The film was entered in the Slamdance Film Festival, Valenciennes Film Festival, and Agen American Indie Film Festival.
Marc Levin was nominated for the Grand Special Prize at the Deauville Film Festival.

Reception
Brooklyn Babylon received mixed reviews by critics, earning a 50% "Fresh" rating on Rotten Tomatoes and a score of 26 on Metacritic.

References

External links

2001 films
American drama films
2000s English-language films
Films directed by Marc Levin
Films set in Brooklyn
Films based on Romeo and Juliet
Films based on the Hebrew Bible
2000s hip hop films
Films based on multiple works
2000s American films